Gill Arnette Byrd (born February 20, 1961) is an American former professional football player who was a cornerback for the San Diego Chargers of the National Football League (NFL). He was a two-time Pro Bowl selection in 1991 and 1992 for the Chargers after graduating from San Jose State University. Byrd was inducted into the Chargers Hall of Fame in 1998. He was an All-City running back and defensive back at Lowell High School (San Francisco), helping to lead the Cardinals to the city championship in his senior season of 1978.

Coaching career
Byrd began his coaching career in 2003 as a volunteer with the St. Louis Rams. He was promoted to assistant secondary coach in 2005. On February 20, 2006, Byrd was hired by the Chicago Bears. In 2007, he served as the assistant defensive backs coach after holding the position of defensive quality control coach in his first year with the team. Byrd was promoted to assistant defensive backs/safeties coach on January 16, 2008. Byrd was fired on January 19, 2013. He became the Tampa Bay Buccaneers cornerbacks coach in 2014. He was fired following the 2015 NFL season. On February 7, 2017, the Buffalo Bills hired Byrd to oversee the team's defensive backs. He left the job in January and he is coached the defensive backs at the University of Illinois.

Personal life
His sons, Gill Byrd, Jr. and Jairus Byrd, played college football at New Mexico State University and the University of Oregon, respectively. Jairus was selected by the Buffalo Bills with the 42nd pick in the 2009 NFL Draft as a cornerback, but was moved to the free safety position, at which he made the  Pro Bowl in 2009, 2012, and 2013. His nephew is Richard Rodgers II, a tight end for the Los Angeles Chargers.

References

External links
Tampa Bay Buccaneers bio

1961 births
Living people
Players of American football from San Francisco
American football cornerbacks
American football safeties
American Conference Pro Bowl players
Buffalo Bills coaches
Chicago Bears coaches
Illinois Fighting Illini football coaches
Lowell High School (San Francisco) alumni
San Jose State Spartans football players
San Diego Chargers players
St. Louis Rams coaches
Tampa Bay Buccaneers coaches
Ed Block Courage Award recipients